Penelope Lagos  is an American actress, model and author. She is best known for playing the role of Mabel Normand in the short film Madcap Mabel.

In October 2017, Lagos's first book I Miss My Best Friend was released.

Personal life
A graduate of Rutgers University in New Brunswick, New Jersey with a BA in Communication and Information Studies and Theater Arts, she currently resides in New Jersey.

Career
Lagos is an actress, model and author who began her career in the short film Hit N'Run in 2007.  She appeared in the web series WildFlower in which she played the role of Det. Nadia Williams.  In 2010, she appeared in the short film Madcap Mabel.

In 2011, Lagos starred in the films Meanwhile and Stuck in the Middle.  Her role in the feature film Stuck won her Best Actress in a feature film at the Downbeach Film Festival. Lagos starred in the feature-length comedy  The Jersey Devil  which premiered at The Landmark Lowes Theater in Jersey City. She also had a supporting role in Ned Rifle, an official selection at The Toronto Film Festival in 2014.

In October 2017, Lagos released her debut children's book, I Miss My Best Friend.

Filmography

References

External links

Actresses from New Jersey
American film actresses
Living people
American children's writers
Rutgers University alumni
Year of birth missing (living people)
21st-century American women